Križevci (in older sources Tótkeresztúr) is a village in the Municipality of Gornji Petrovci in the Prekmurje region of Slovenia.

Name
The name of the settlement was changed from Križevci v Prekmurju to Križevci in 1952. Its name (literally, 'crosses') is derived from a chapel dedicated to the Holy Cross that used to stand in the village, but was pulled down in the late 19th century.

Cultural heritage
There is a large Lutheran church in the village, built in 1785 and enlarged in 1885. It is one of the earliest Lutheran churches in Prekmurje.

Notable people
Notable people that were born or lived in Križevci include:
János Berke (1814–1908), writer
Pál Luthár (1839–1919), writer
Milan Kučan (born 1941), the first president of independent Slovenia

References

External links

Križevci on Geopedia

Populated places in the Municipality of Gornji Petrovci